John Fallon Pressman (September 6, 1952 – July 24, 2009) is a former Democratic member of the Pennsylvania House of Representatives.

He died after collapsing on a hike in 2009.

References

Democratic Party members of the Pennsylvania House of Representatives
2009 deaths
1952 births
Place of birth missing
20th-century American politicians